30 Camelopardalis is a star in the northern circumpolar constellation of Camelopardalis, located about 539 light years away from the Sun based on parallax. It can be viewed with the naked eye in good seeing conditions, appearing as a dim, white-hued point of light with an apparent visual magnitude of 6.14. This is most likely a slowly rotating A-type main-sequence star with a stellar classification of A0Vs, which indicates it is generating energy via hydrogen fusion at its core. It is moving further from the Earth with a heliocentric radial velocity of +12 km/s.

References

A-type main-sequence stars
Camelopardalis (constellation)
Durchmusterung objects
Camelopardalis, 30
038831
027731
2006